This is a list of American television-related events in 1972.

Events

Programs

60 Minutes (1968–)
All in the Family (1971–1979)
All My Children (1970–2011)
American Bandstand (1952–1989)
Another World (1964–1999)
As the World Turns (1956–2010)
Bonanza (1959–1973)
Bozo the Clown (1949–)
Candid Camera (1948–)
Captain Kangaroo (1955–1984)
Columbo (1971–1978)
Days of Our Lives (1965–)
Face the Nation (1954–)
General Hospital (1963–)
Gunsmoke (1955–1975)
Hallmark Hall of Fame (1951–)
Hawaii Five-O (1968–1980)
Hee Haw (1969–1993)
Here's Lucy (1968–1974)
Ironside (1967–1975)
It's Academic (1961–)
Jeopardy! (1964–1975, 1984–)
Kimba the White Lion (1966–1967), re-runs
Laugh-In (1968–1973)
Leave It To Beaver (1957–1963)
Lost In Space (1965–1968)
Love is a Many Splendored Thing (1967–73)
Love of Life (1951–1980)
Love, American Style (1969–1974)
Mannix (1967–1975)
Marcus Welby, M.D. (1969–1976)
Mary Tyler Moore (1970–77)
Masterpiece Theatre (1971–)
McCloud (1970–1977)
McMillan & Wife (1971–1977)
Meet the Press (1947–)
Mission: Impossible (1966–1973)
Monday Night Football (1970–)
One Life to Live (1968–2012)
Play School (1966–)
Rainbow (1972–1992)
Room 222 (1969–1974)
Search for Tomorrow (1951–1986)
Sesame Street (1969–)
Soul Train (1971–)
The Benny Hill Show (1969–1989)
The Brady Bunch (1969–1974)
The Carol Burnett Show (1967–1978)
The Dean Martin Show (1965–1974)
The Doctors (1963–1982)
The Doris Day Show (1968–1973)
The Edge of Night (1956–1984)
The Flip Wilson Show (1970–1974)
The Guiding Light (1952–2009)
The Lawrence Welk Show (1955–1982)
The Mike Douglas Show (1961–1981)
The Mod Squad (1968–1973)
The New Dick Van Dyke Show (1971–1974)
The Newlywed Game (1966–1974)
The Odd Couple (1970–75)
The Partridge Family (1970–1974)
The Price Is Right (1972–)
The Secret Storm (1954–1974)
The Sonny & Cher Comedy Hour (1971–1974)
The Today Show (1952–)
The Tonight Show Starring Johnny Carson (1962–1992)
The Wonderful World of Disney (1969–1979)
Tom and Jerry (1965–1972, 1975–1977, 1980–1982)
Truth or Consequences (1950–1988)
Where the Heart Is (1969–1973)

Debuts

Ending this year

TV movies and miniseries
September 19: The Woman Hunter (CBS)

Births

Deaths

Networks and services

Network launches

Television stations

Sign-ons

Network affiliation changes

Station closures

See also 
1972 in television 
1972 in film 
List of American films of 1972

References

External links 
List of 1972 American television series at IMDb